The 1994 World Lacrosse Championship was the seventh edition of the international men's lacrosse championship. It was hosted at Gigg Lane in Bury, Greater Manchester, England from July 20–30, 1994 and won by the United States. Japan competed for the first time in the tournament.

Results

Standings

Bracket

See also
 Federation of International Lacrosse, the unified governing body for world lacrosse founded in 2008
 World Lacrosse Championship

References

External links
 Federation of International Lacrosse
 1998 World Lacrosse Championships

1994
World Lacrosse Championship
1994
1990 in English sport
International sports competitions in Manchester